Staatsarchiv may refer to the archives of one of several national or sub-national governments:

 Hessisches Staatsarchiv Marburg, the archives of the state of Hesse, situated in Marburg, Germany
 Österreichisches Staatsarchiv, the national archives of Austria
 Staatsarchiv Bern, the archives of the canton of Bern, Switzerland
 Staatsarchiv Ludwigsburg, the archives of various public bodies in and around the city of Stuttgart, Germany
 Staatsarchiv München, the archives of the administration of Upper Bavaria, Germany
 Staatsarchiv des Kantons St. Gallen, the archives of the canton of St Gallen, Switzerland
 Staatsarchiv Zürich, the archives of the canton of Zürich, Switzerland